Hamane Niang (born 6 June 1952) is a Malian politician and basketball executive, who is the current president of the International Basketball Federation (FIBA).

Career 
After his primary education in Kayes and secondary education in Bamako, Niang continued his studies in Dakar, Senegal, where he obtained a Masters in Economic Science and to Caen (France) where he obtained a diplôme d'études supérieures spécialisées (DESS), in finance.

On his return to Mali, he was assistant director of credit at the Banque du Développement du Mali between 1981 and 1989 before being named assistant to the cabinet at the Ministry of Finance and Commerce and entering Mobil Oil Mali as head of compatibility services, as well as administrative director and financier.

In 1994, he was named director of commercial services and joint director general of Elf Oil Mali/Total Mali. In 2005, he became director-general of Malienne de l'automobile.

On 3 October 2019, Niang was named Minister of Youth and Sports in the government of Modibo Sidibé. He stayed in this post in the reshuffle of 9.

Basketball executive career 
Since 1999, Niang has been president of the Malian Basketball Federation.

In 2019, Hamane Niang was elected as the President of the FIBA.

References

1952 births
Living people
Basketball executives
People from Kayes
Government ministers of Mali
21st-century Malian people